Becky Zerlentes (July 8, 1970 – April 3, 2005) was a professor of geography, amateur boxer, and martial artist.

Personal life
Zerlentes was a professor of geography and economics at Front Range Community College's Larimer County campus.  Zerlentes earned her master's and PhD in geography at the University of Illinois at Urbana-Champaign.  She had a wide variety of interests, including martial arts, boxing, synchronized swimming, ice skating, and academic pursuits.  She was married to fellow economics professor, Dr. Stephan Weiler.

Martial arts accomplishments
Zerlentes was a black belt in Goshin Jitsu, which she earned in 1996.  She often told her students that she started training with Goshin Jitsu after coming to one of the club parties.  She later became the chief instructor of the club from 1998 to 1999.  Zerlentes also earned a black belt in Danzan Ryu Jujitsu and was certified in Okazaki restorative massage.  Zerlentes enjoyed teaching, particularly self-defense, something she believed was critical for women to learn.

Amateur boxing career
Zerlentes had a record of 6 wins and 4 losses.  She won a regional Golden Gloves in 2002.

Death

On April 2, 2005 Zerlentes was participating in the Colorado State Boxing Senior Female Championships at the Denver Coliseum in Denver, Colorado.  She was knocked out in the third round by her opponent, Heather Schmitz, fell unconscious, and never regained consciousness.  Zerlentes is the first woman known to have died of injuries sustained during a sanctioned boxing match in the United States. According to the Denver County coroner the cause of death was blunt force trauma to the head.

Boxing Record
Zerlentes competed in triathlons and swimming, did martial arts and had an amateur boxing record of 6-4.

References

Boxers from Colorado
Deaths due to injuries sustained in boxing
American women boxers
1970 births
2005 deaths
Sports deaths in Colorado
University of Illinois Urbana-Champaign alumni
Lightweight boxers
20th-century American women
20th-century American people
21st-century American women